Esther Alder (born 1958 in Solothurn) is a Swiss politician. She has served on the City Council of Geneva since 2011. As of 2015, she was the mayor of Geneva. She is a member of the Green Party.

References

External links
Esther Alder's official blog

1958 births
Living people
Women mayors of places in Switzerland
Mayors of Geneva
People from Solothurn
Swiss city councillors
Green Party of Switzerland politicians
21st-century Swiss women politicians
21st-century Swiss politicians